William Longsword (c. 893–942) was the second ruler of Normandy, from 927 until his assassination in 942.

William Longsword may also refer to:
William II of England or William Longsword (c. 1056–1100)
William Longsword, a crusader who led English troops at the Siege of Lisbon (1147)
William FitzEmpress (1136-1164), who subscribed a charter as 'Willelmi Longespe'
William of Montferrat, Count of Jaffa and Ascalon (c. 1140–1177), crusader
William of Winchester, Lord of Lüneburg (1184–1213), son of Henry the Lion
William Longespée, 3rd Earl of Salisbury (1176–1226), illegitimate son of Henry II of England
William II Longespée (1212–1250), crusader